The Mankato Public Library and Reading Room is a former library building in Mankato, Minnesota, United States.  It was built as a Carnegie library from 1902 to 1903 and housed Mankato's public library until 1977.  The building was listed on the National Register of Historic Places in 1980 for its local significance in the themes of architecture and education.  It was nominated for its association with the Carnegie library phenomenon and for its Renaissance Revival architecture using local materials.

The city of Mankato sold the building to the Mankato Area Arts Council in 1979.  It housed a music education program and provided office space to various non-profit arts organizations.  As of 2022, it operates as the Carnegie Art Center, with two art galleries, a gift shop of work by regional artists, and rental studio space.

See also
 National Register of Historic Places listings in Blue Earth County, Minnesota

References

External links
 Carnegie Art Center

1903 establishments in Minnesota
Buildings and structures in Blue Earth County, Minnesota
Carnegie libraries in Minnesota
Former library buildings in the United States
Libraries on the National Register of Historic Places in Minnesota
Library buildings completed in 1903
Mankato, Minnesota
National Register of Historic Places in Blue Earth County, Minnesota
Public libraries in Minnesota
Romanesque Revival architecture in Minnesota